Salif Sanou (born 8 November 1967) is a Burkinabé footballer. He played in one match for the Burkina Faso national football team in 1995. He was also named in Burkina Faso's squad for the 1996 African Cup of Nations tournament.

References

External links
 

1967 births
Living people
Burkinabé footballers
Burkina Faso international footballers
1996 African Cup of Nations players
Place of birth missing (living people)
Association football forwards
21st-century Burkinabé people